Arjeplog is a locality and the seat of Arjeplog Municipality in Norrbotten County, province of Lapland, Sweden with 1,977 inhabitants in 2010.

It is a popular winter test site for the Asian and European car industries and featured on an episode of the British TV show Top Gear.

Arjeplog has in the past offered families 100,000 kronor, or individuals 25,000 kronor to move to the town.

Climate
Arjeplog has a subarctic climate (Dfc) typical of northern Sweden. Its winters are somewhat moderated by the mild maritime North Atlantic air to the west, although they are still very cold, long and snowy. Summers are short but can occasionally be warm and they also very bright due to Arjeplog's position close to the Arctic Circle. Daylight is sparse in winter, but during summer midnight sun is present for three weeks. For an even longer period than that it does not get dark in Arjeplog. The presence of the midnight sun is in spite of Arjeplog being below the Arctic Circle, and is caused by the sun's trajectory not quite dropping below 0° in angle. As it is below the line Arjeplog does not experience complete lack of daylight during the winter solstice, but it is limited to less than three hours.

Arjeplog is located on the lake of Hornavan, that freezes over every winter due to the cold temperatures, whereas the lake temperatures remain cool also in summer.

See also 
 Hornavan
 Hornavanskolan

References 

Municipal seats of Norrbotten County
Swedish municipal seats
Road test tracks
Populated lakeshore places in Sweden
Populated places in Arjeplog Municipality
Lapland (Sweden)